Events from the year 1949 in Ireland.

Incumbents
 President: Seán T. O'Kelly
 Taoiseach: John A. Costello (FG)
 Tánaiste: William Norton (Lab)
 Minister for Finance: Patrick McGilligan (FG)
 Chief Justice: Conor Maguire
 Dáil: 13th
 Seanad: 6th

Events
 22 March – the Irish Government leases a residence in the Phoenix Park to the United States government for a period of 99 years. It will be the residence of the U.S. ambassador.
 17 April – at midnight 26 counties officially leave the British Commonwealth under terms of the Republic of Ireland Act 1948. A 21-gun salute on O'Connell Bridge, Dublin, ushers in the Republic of Ireland.
 29 April – Major de Courcy Wheeler, the man who accepted the surrender of Patrick Pearse in 1916, presents President Seán T. O'Kelly with Pearse's revolver at a special function at Áras an Uachtaráin.
 3 May – the Parliament of the United Kingdom passes the Ireland Act guaranteeing the position of Northern Ireland as part of the United Kingdom as long as a majority of its citizens want it to be. The government also recognises the existence of the Republic of Ireland.
 10 May – the Oireachtas motion calls a "Protest Against Partition" because of the UK's Ireland Act provisions.
 13 May – John A. Costello, Éamon de Valera, William Norton and Seán MacBride share a platform to protest the British government's attitude to the constitutional status of Northern Ireland.
 25 May – Princess Elizabeth (later Queen Elizabeth II) and The Duke of Edinburgh receive the freedom of Belfast during a visit to the city.
 26 June – 80,000 people gather in Croke Park to affirm the pledge as members of the teetotal Pioneer Total Abstinence Society.
 9 July – the last tram runs from Nelson Pillar to Blackrock and will be the last tram run in Dublin until the Luas.
 12 July – Douglas Hyde, first President of Ireland and founder of the Gaelic League, dies in Dublin aged 89.
 24 August – Tánaiste William Norton tells the European Consultative Assembly in Strasbourg that Ireland would not agree to a customs union of western European states.
 8 November – street names in any language other than English are prohibited by an Amendment to a Bill passed in the Senate of Northern Ireland.
 20 November – students and academic staff celebrate the centenary of University College Galway.
 The Electricity Supply Board completes its Liffey scheme, providing hydroelectricity generating stations at Poulaphouca, Golden Falls and Leixlip and a water supply Reservoir for Dublin at the former location.

Unknown date
 Golden Vale Creameries founded in Charleville.
 At this year's Convention, Irish Republican Army members are ordered to join Sinn Féin.

Arts and literature
 Publication of Máirtín Ó Cadhain's first novel, Cré na Cille ("Churchyard Clay", written 1944–45), illustrated by Charles Lamb.
 Publication of Máirtín Ó Direáin's first poetry collection, Rogha Dánta.
 Publication of Séamus Ó Néill's poetry for children, Dánta do pháistí.
 Daniel O'Neill paints Place du Tertre and The Blue Skirt.

In literature
 14–18 April – Breandán Ó hEithir's novel Lig Sinn i gCathú (1976) is set in a fictionalised city of Galway during this period.

Sport

Football
League of Ireland
Winners: Drumcondra

FAI Cup
Winners: Dundalk 3–0 Shelbourne.

Golf
Irish Open is won by Harry Bradshaw (Ireland).

Births
11 January – Billy Roche, playwright and writer.
16 January – R. F. Foster, historian.
20 January – Michael Ahern, Fianna Fáil TD and Minister of State.
30 January – Joe Callanan, Fianna Fáil TD.
1 February – Joan Burton, Labour Party Deputy Leader, TD for Dublin West.
2 February – John McAreavey, Bishop of Dromore.
5 February – Nuala Ahern, Green Party Member of the European Parliament representing Leinster.
6 February – Jim Sheridan, film director.
12 February – Fergus Slattery, international rugby player.
3 March – Frank Chambers, Fianna Fáil senator.
3 March – Ben Dunne, chief executive of Dunnes Stores.
9 April – Sorcha Cusack, actress.
18 April – Peter Caffrey, actor (died 2008).
18 April – Avril Doyle, Fine Gael Member of the European Parliament representing Leinster.
1 May – Joe Higgins, Socialist Party TD.
18 May – Pat Rabbitte, Leader of the Labour Party.
23 May – Martin Cahill, Dublin criminal (shot and killed 1994).
11 July – Shane Ross, journalist, member of the 22nd Seanad representing the University of Dublin.
13 July – Bryan Murray, actor.
18 August – John O'Leary, golfer.
20 August – Phil Lynott, English rock singer-songwriter (died 1986).
26 August – Thomas Murphy, Irish republican.
27 August – Ann Murray, mezzo-soprano.
1 September – Liam Fitzgerald, Fianna Fáil TD and Senator.
4 September – Michael McKevitt, Irish republican convicted of directing terrorism as leader of the Real IRA (died 2021).
9 September – Charlie Bird, journalist and broadcaster, Chief News Correspondent with RTÉ.
29 September – Gabriel Rosenstock, poet.
30 September – Charlie McCreevy, Fianna Fáil TD and Cabinet Minister, European Commissioner.
October – Enda Bonner, Fianna Fáil Councillor and Senator.
3 October – Jim McDaid, Fianna Fáil TD representing Donegal North-East and Cabinet Minister.
20 October – Eddie Macken, show jumper.
29 October – Seán Foley, Limerick hurler.
12 November – Dermot Gleeson, barrister, businessman, Attorney General.
Full date unknown
Sean Delaney, soccer player and coach (died 2004).
Johnny Flaherty, Offaly hurler.
Pat Moylan, Cork hurler.
Nicky Ryan, music producer.

Deaths
18 January – James Magee, cricketer (born 1872).
2 March – Cecil Lowry-Corry, 6th Earl Belmore, high sheriff and councillor (born 1873).
29 April – Timothy J. Murphy, Labour Party (Ireland) TD.
23 May – Dan Comyn, cricketer (born 1872).
12 July – Douglas Hyde, member of the Seanad in 1922 and 1938; first President of Ireland and Gaelic scholar (born 1860).
10 September – Brian Brady, Fianna Fáil TD.
6 October – Robert Wilson Lynd, writer (born 1879).
8 October – Edith Anna Somerville, novelist (born 1858).
14 November – Jimmy Dunne, soccer player (born 1905).

References

 
1940s in Ireland
Ireland
Years of the 20th century in Ireland